A. mexicana  may refer to:
 Alfaroa mexicana, a plant species endemic to Mexico
 Argemone mexicana, the Mexican poppy, Mexican prickly poppy, cardo or cardosanto, a plant species found in Mexico

See also
 Mexicana (disambiguation)